The Freikorps Oberland (also Bund Oberland or Kameradschaft Freikorps und Bund Oberland) was a voluntary paramilitary organization that, in the early years of the Weimar Republic, fought against Communist and Polish insurgents. It was successful in the 1921 Battle of Annaberg and became the core of the Sturmabteilung (SA) in Bavaria while several members later turned against the Nazis.

The group was founded in April 1919 by Rudolf von Sebottendorf, president of Thule Society. The cabinet of Johannes Hoffmann (SPD) had fled from Bavarian Soviet Republic to Bamberg. Major Albert Ritter von Beckh (1870–1958) assumed military control. Most of the volunteers came from Bavaria, and therefore the symbol of the Edelweiß was chosen. Its direct precursor was the "Kampfbund" within Thule Society, which also was against the Bavarian Soviet republic.

In May 1919 Freikorps Oberland fought against the Bavarian Soviet Republic. Elements of the Freikorps, combined with Freikorps Epp became the Reichswehr brigade 21, which in 1920 fought in the Occupation of the Ruhr. The Freikorps itself was dissolved on 21 October 1919. However, all members went to Organization Escherich (Georg Escherich).

Therefore, in the Silesian Uprisings 1921 the Freikorps was quickly ready and participated in the conquest of the eponymic hill in Annaberg in Upper Silesia. In Upper Silesia the Freikorps also had a propaganda unit. It is believed to have ordered the Feme murders and kidnappings. It had close connections with radical right-wing organizations in Bavaria. The murderers of Matthias Erzberger, Heinrich Tillessen and Heinrich Schulz did not only belong to Organization Consul, but also to "Arbeitsgemeinschaft Oberland".(Committee Oberland). Some members of Oberland were possibly involved with the murder of USPD politician Karl Gareis (1889-1921).

Separation
In summer 1922 the Bund became separated because of the question whether Bund Oberland should be integrated into Bund Bayern und Reich. The civil wing formed Bund Treu Oberland, later Blücherbund. The military wing was led by veterinarian Friedrich Weber.

In 1922 the Bund Oberland had a few hundred members. Until November 1923 in Bavaria were around 2000 members. Amongst them were many students, employees, members of free professions, and also some workers. Most of the military leaders were young former officers, who studied meanwhile. Most of the members were between 20 and 30 years old and had the experience of fighting either in the World War I or in the fights in Bavaria, Ruhr area or in Upper Silesia. They had enough weapons, however many weapons of the Bund were stored and maintained by the Reichswehr. Maybe the Bund was supported by the father-in-law of Friedrich Weber, national publisher Julius Friedrich Lehmann.

Under the guidance of Weber Bund Oberland approached continuously to the radical people under Adolf Hitler and Ernst Röhm. Together with the "Wehrverband Reichsflagge" and the SA the Bund formed in January 1923 the "Arbeitsgemeinschaft vaterländischer Kampfverbände". In September 1923 they joined together with the Nazi Party and more national organizations the "Deutscher Kampfbund". From 25 September 1923, the Kampfbund was guided by Adolf Hitler.

Beer Hall Putsch
On 8 November 1923 the Bund activated many members and participated actively in the Hitlerputsch. Members of the Bund, led by Ludwig Oestreicher took Jewish people as hostages.

Because of his participation in the coup attempt the Bund Oberland e. V. first was forbidden in Bavaria and at the end of 1923 all over Germany. By act of Gustav Ritter von Kahr the Bund Oberland was dissolved on 9 November 1923. Weber was sent to prison the same day and later accused in the Hitler-Process and sentenced to five years in prison. Former members of the Bund co-worked with extreme right terror organization Organisation Consul. On 9. Januar 1924 they killed in French-occupied palatine separatism leader Franz Josef Heinz.

Reestablishment 1925
After the end of the ban, the Bund was re-established in February 1925. By 1930 there were differences, namely because the strong Austrian branch accepted the leadership of  the Austrofascist Ernst Rüdiger Starhemberg, whose specifically Austrian brand of Fascism was in marked rivalry and contradiction to the Pan-German Fascism of Hitler and the Nazis.

Postwar
After the War, in 1951, the old fighters gathered around Ernst Horadam and founded the still-existing tradition community Kameradschaft Freikorps und Bund Oberland.
Some authors think of it is an extreme right organization. As late as 2006, a church service took place in Schliersee to commemorate the members of the Freikorps killed in 1921. According to a statement of the president of Landsmannschaft Schlesien the event was regularly monitored by the State Office for the Protection of the Constitution. 
Since 2007 the commemorate became much smaller.

Members
Friedrich Weber, (1892-1954) head of veterinary surgery in Germany, also the group's leader
Richard Arauner, (1902-1936)SS-Oberführer
Karl Astel (1898-1945), Nazi eugenics
Eleonore Baur, (1885-1981)SS-Oberführer in KZ Dachau
Albert Ritter von Beckh, SS-Gruppenführer
Kurt Benson, SS-Oberführer
Josef Dietrich, (1892-1966), SS-Oberstgruppenführer and Generaloberst der Waffen-SS
Hans Dorn, SS-Sturmbannführer, Commanding Suppily Officer Dachau Concentration Camp 1934-1936 
Fritz Fischer, (1908-1999), historian, SA- and NSDAP-member
Karl Gebhardt, (1897-1948),SS-Gruppenführer, physician in Ravensbrück concentration camp
Franz Gutsmiedl, Reichstag delegate
Wilhelm Harster, (1904-1991), SS-Brigadeführer
Franz Hayler, (1900-1972), SS-Gruppenführer
Richard Hildebrandt, SS-Obergruppenführer
Heinrich Himmler, (1900-1945), Reichsführer SS and Chef of German Police
Hans Hinkel, (1901-1960),SS-Gruppenführe, Reichstag delegate
Ernst Horadam, SA-Obersturmbannführer
Max Humps, SS-Oberführer
Friedrich Gustav Jaeger, (1895-1944), Officer and resistance leader in 20 July plot
Rudolf Jordan, (1902-1988), SA-Obergruppenführer, Gauleiter of Magdeburg
Gerhard Krüger, (1908-1994), student leader
Max Lebsche, physician, opponent of the Nazi regime
Emil Maurice, (1897-1972), SS-Standartenführer
Carl von Oberkamp, SS-Brigadeführer and Generalmajor der Waffen-SS
Ludwig Oestreicher
Maximilian du Prel, Baron, Nazi author and press chief of the General Government in occupied Poland
Heinz Reinefarth, (1903-1979), SS-Gruppenführer and Generalleutnant der Waffen-SS, war criminal
Arthur Rödl, (1898-1945),  SS-Obersturmbannführer and commandant of Gross-Rosen concentration camp
Josef Römer, (1892-1944), Jurist, staff officer, later a communist and resistance member
Arnold Ruge, university teacher
Ludwig Schmuck, SA-Gruppenführer
Fritz von Scholz, (1896-1944), SS-Gruppenführer and Generalleutnant der Waffen-SS
Ernst Rüdiger Starhemberg, (1899-1956), Austrofascist politician, opponent of the Nazi regime
Bodo Uhse, (1904-1963), writer, Nazi supporter but later a communist
Hilmar Wäckerle,(1899-1941), SS-Standartenführer and commandant of Dachau concentration camp

Literature
Hans Fenske: Konservativismus und Rechtsradikalismus in Bayern nach 1918. Verlag Gehlen, 1969
Kameradschaft Freikorps und Bund Oberland: Bildchronik zur Geschichte des Freikorps und Bundes Oberland. München 1974 
Peter Schuster: Für das stolze Edelweiß, Brienna, Achau, 1995. 
Oliver Schröm, Andrea Röpke: Stille Hilfe für braune Kameraden. Ch. Links Verlag, Berlin 2001, 
Andreas Angerstorf: Rechte Strukturen in Bayern 2005, Bayernforum,

References

External links
Christoph Hübner, Bund Oberland, in Historisches Lexikon Bayerns mit Bildern
Infoseite zum Freikorps und den Gegenveranstaltungen
„Kennzeichen Edelweiß“, Artikel aus der Wochenzeitschrift "Freitag (Zeitung)"
Als "Patrioten" pflegen sie stolz den unseligen Geist, "Artikel aus Süddeutsche Zeitung"
Magnus Bosch: Heldengedenken im Zeichen des Edelweiß - Artikel aus dem Magazin "Hinterland"

Oberland
Paramilitary organisations of the Weimar Republic
Military units and formations established in 1919
1919 establishments in Germany
Military units and formations disestablished in 1923
1923 disestablishments in Germany
Military units and formations established in 1925
1925 establishments in Germany
Anti-communist organizations